The Men's 500 metres race of the 2016 World Single Distances Speed Skating Championships was held on 14 February 2016.

Results
The first run was started at 14:34 and the second run at 16:19.

References

Men's 500 metres